Arthur Ludwich (18 May 1840, Lyck in East Prussia – 12 November 1920, Königsberg) was a German classical philologist who specialized in Homeric studies. He is remembered for his observations involving the metric and prosody of Homer.

He studied theology and classical philology at the University of Königsberg, where his instructors included Karl Lehrs and Ludwig Friedlander. In 1874–75 he conducted Homeric research in Italy, and during the following year, became an associate professor at the University of Breslau. In 1878 he succeeded Lehrs as professor of Greek philology at Königsberg.

Selected works 
 Aristarchs Homerische Textkritik nach den Fragmenten des Didymos (2 volumes), 1884–85 – Aristarchus' Homeric textual criticism according to the fragment of Didymos.
 Homeri Odyssea (2 volumes), 1889, 1891 – Homer's "Odyssey".
 Die Homervulgata als voralexandrinisch erwiesen, 1898 – The vulgate Homer as pre-Alexandrian evidence.
 Homeri Ilias (2 volumes), 1901–02. Homer's "Iliad".
 Anekdota zur griechischen Orthographie, 1905 – Anecdota to Greek orthography.
 Homerischer Hymnenbau nebst seinen Nachahmungen bei Kallimachos, Theokrit, Vergil, Nonnos und Anderen, 1908 – Homeric hymn construction together with its imitations in Callimachus, Theocritus, Virgil, Nonnus and others.
 Nonni Panopolitani Dionysiaca (2 volumes) 1909, 1911.

References 

1840 births
1920 deaths
German classical philologists
Academic staff of the University of Breslau
Academic staff of the University of Königsberg
People from Ełk